Huehuetenango is a city and municipality in the highlands of western Guatemala. It is also the capital of the department of Huehuetenango. Its primary export is coffee.

Overview 

Huehuetenango (originally called Xinabajul in the Mam language) was already a Maya settlement before the Spanish conquest of the fortified city of Zaculeu, which was the Pre-Columbian capital of the Mam kingdom situated just a few kilometers from Xinabahul. 'Huehuetenango' means place of the ancients (or ancestors) in Nahuatl, which is the name Gonzalo de Alvarado adopted from his Nahua allies when Zaculeu and Xinabahul were conquered.

Many people of Mam descent still live in and around Huehuetenango, and the nearby ruins of Zaculeu have become a tourist attraction. The ruins are markedly distinct from other Maya archeological sites; the original unearthed stones, comprising only a small portion of the original structures, were coated with plaster during restoration works carried out in the 1940s. There is also a small museum at Zaculeu that includes statues and small artifacts found on the site.

Huehuetenango Airport  is within the city and has a paved  runway and a small terminal building. There are currently no scheduled airline flights.

Climate
The city has a subtropical highland climate (Köppen: Cwb), with warm summers and mild winters.

Sports
The city currently boasts one Guatemalan top level football side Xinabajul in the Liga Nacional de Fútbol de Guatemala.

Notable people
Former president Efraín Ríos Montt was born in Huehuetenango (in 1926). His younger brother, Mario Enrique Ríos Montt the emeritus auxiliary bishop of the Roman Catholic Archdiocese of Guatemala in 1932.

Notes 

Municipalities of the Huehuetenango Department
Populated places established in 1524